

Season review
United finished the 1998–99 SPL season in 9th place with 34 points, in the SPL's debut season.

The cup campaigns brought mixed fortunes: a League Cup 3rd round exit to Ross County was bettered by a Scottish Cup semi-final loss to Celtic.

Bank of Scotland Premierleague

Tennent's Scottish Cup

Coca-Cola Cup

Player details
During the 1998-99 season, United used 35 different players comprising 11 nationalities, plus two unused substitutes. The table below shows the number of appearances and goals scored by each player.

|}

Goalscorers
United had 17 players score with the team scoring 47 goals in total. The top goalscorer was Billy Dodds, who finished the season with 17 goals.

Discipline
During the 1998–99 season, four United players were sent off and 23 players received at least one caution. In total, the team received four red cards and x yellows.

Team statistics

League table

Transfers

In
Seventeen players were signed during the 1998–99 season, with a total (public) transfer cost of over £1.75m. One loan signing was also made during the season.

The players that joined Dundee United during the 1998–99 season, along with their previous club, are listed below.

Loans in

Out
Fourteen players left the club during and at the end of the 1998–99 season, with one player also going out on loan. The club received £900k in transfer fees, amounting to around half of the transfer expenditure.

Listed below are the players that left during the season, along with the club that they joined. Players did not necessarily join their next club immediately.

Loans out

Playing kit

The jerseys were sponsored for a third time by Telewest.

Trivia
 Joe Miller, who signed from Aberdeen, scored two goals during his time with United - both against Aberdeen.
 United led eventual champions Celtic in three of the four league matches in 1998–99 but only managed to take one point.
 United's highest and lowest home attendances occurred in consecutive matches at Tannadice - nearly 13,000 watched United in a goalless draw against Rangers while less than 6,500 turned up eleven days later to watch them play Dunfermline. It was the second season in a row that United's lowest home attendance was against the Pars.

References

Dundee United F.C. seasons
Dundee United